Miguel Ángel Gallardo Paredes (27 December 1955 – 21 February 2022) was a Spanish comic book artist.

Biography
He was known as a representative of the Spanish underground comics' scene of the 1970s and 1980s, publishing in magazines such as El Víbora, Cairo, Complot and Viñetas and  characters such as Makoki. Later, he opted for the biographical genre, with the publication of works such as Un largo silencio and the award-winning María y yo (Maria and Me). 

In 2009, he published with Paco Roca Emotional World Tour, where they tell the anecdotes related to the promotion of their latest comics. In 2011, he illustrated the first two covers of the new war feats.

Gallardo died on 21 February 2022, at the age of 66.

Awards and nominations 
 2008 Premio Haxtur for "Best Cover Art" for  "María y yo" 
 2008 Nominated for Premio Haxtur  of "Best Short Story" for  "María y yo" at the Salón Internacional del Cómic del Principado de Asturias Gijón
 In 2013, Gallardo was awarded the Gráffica Prize, together with   Alex Trochut, Álvaro Sobrino, América Sánchez, Andreu Balius, Astiberri, Atipo, Clara Montagut, Jaime Serra y No-Domain.

References

External links 
 Official website

1955 births
2022 deaths
People from Lleida
Spanish cartoonists